Villas Boas is a surname. Notable people with the surname include:

André Villas-Boas (born 1977), Portuguese football manager
 Antônio Vilas Boas, alleged UFO abductee (1934–1991)
Villas-Bôas brothers, Orlando (1914–2002), Cláudio (1916–1998) and Leonardo Villas-Bôas (1918–1961), Brazilian activists regarding indigenous peoples
Waldir Villas Boas (1925–2004), Brazilian footballer